Infernal was a wooden-hulled paddle frigate of the French Navy.

She took part in the Crimean War.

She was eventually burnt by accident at Valparaiso on 1 October 1861.

Sources
 Roche, Jean-Michel: Dictionnaire des bâtiments de la Flotte de guerre française de Colbert à nos jours - Tome (Volume) I : 1671 - 1870. Self-publication, 2005.

Frigates of France
Crimean War naval ships of France
Ships built in France
Frigates of the French Navy
1843 ships
Ship fires
Maritime incidents in Chile
Maritime incidents in October 1861
Shipwrecks of Chile
Shipwrecks in the Chilean Sea